Saints Rufus and Carpophorus (Carpone, Carponius) (died c. 295) were Christians who were martyred at Capua during the reign of Diocletian.  Their Acta state that Rufus was a deacon.

One Saint Rufus for the feast day 27 August also appears as Rufinus in the "Martyrologium Hieronymianum" (ed. cit., 111). The other Saint Rufus is said to have suffered with a companion, Carponius, in Diocletian's persecution circa 304 AD (cf. "Bibliotheca hagiographica latina", II, 1070; Acta SS., VI August, 18–19).

Their feast day is 27 August.

External links
Saint of the Day, August 27: Rufus and Carpophorus (Carpone) at SaintPatrickDC.org
Saints Rufus at the Catholic Encyclopedia

Groups of Christian martyrs of the Roman era
290s deaths
3rd-century Christian martyrs
Year of birth unknown